Jens Dyck is a Belgian footballer.

References

1990 births
Association football midfielders
Living people
Belgian footballers
S.K. Beveren players